Two ships of Bangladesh Navy carried the name BNS Umar Farooq:
 , a  transferred from the Royal Navy.
 , a Type 053H3 (Jiangwei II) frigate transferred from the People's Liberation Army Navy.

Bangladesh Navy ship names